Rezaur Rahman Khan, popularly known as Piplu R Khan or Piplu Khan, is a Bangladeshi filmmaker. After making several television advertisements, he found major success after directing the historical docudrama Hasina: A Daughter's Tale in 2018. The directorial debut film was based on the life of Sheikh Hasina, former and 10th Prime Minister of Bangladesh. In his AD making career, he has worked with some of the brands like Grameenphone, Unilever in Bangladesh as well as in the Mumbai, India. He also sung a song in Hasina: A Daughter's Tale.

Early life and education
Rezaur Rahman Khan was born in Chittagong, Bangladesh. He currently lives in Dhaka.

Piplu received almost all his academic education from Chittagong. He studied at Government Muslim High School for secondary education. Then he got into Government College of Commerce. After completed Higher Secondary School Certificate, he got into University of Dhaka. Though he could not complete the degree due to family and personal reasons. After a year Piplu went back to Chittagong for completed graduation under a college.

Filmography

Docudrama

Web film

TVCs

References

External links
 

Living people
Year of birth missing (living people)
Bangladeshi film directors
Bangladeshi screenwriters
Government Muslim High School alumni
People from Chittagong